Kuchak-e Nazar Khani (also Romanized as Kūchak-e Naz̧ar Khānī; also known as Kūchak-e Naz̧ar Khākī) is a village in Katul Rural District, in the Central District of Aliabad County, Golestan Province, Iran. At the 2006 census, its population was 1,601, in 314 families.

References 

Populated places in Aliabad County